The Robert Clagett Farm is a historic home and farm located at Knoxville, Washington County, Maryland, United States. The house is a one-story sandstone structure measuring three bays long by two bays deep in the Georgian-style. The house features a two-story galleried porch and an interior stone chimney. The farm also includes a small 1875 stone-arched bridge, a mid-19th century dairy barn, a small shed-roofed frame outbuilding which may once have housed pigs, and a 1930s frame garage.

The Robert Clagett Farm was listed on the National Register of Historic Places in 1999.

References

External links
, including photo in 1998, at Maryland Historical Trust

Houses completed in 1775
Houses on the National Register of Historic Places in Maryland
Houses in Washington County, Maryland
Georgian architecture in Maryland
National Register of Historic Places in Washington County, Maryland